Rollin Turner "Woody" Woodyatt (June 3, 1878, Chicago – December 17, 1953, Chicago) was an American physician, known for his contribution to the field of diabetes and other metabolic diseases.

Biography
Rollin T. Woodyatt's father, William Henry Woodyatt (1846–1880), was a Canadian-born, American-educated physician who practiced medicine in Chicago and became a professor of ophthalmology and otology. R. T. Woodyatt was helped by his uncle, the architect Daniel Burnham, whose sister Clara (1850–1939) was widowed by W. H. Woodyatt's early death from diphtheria. R. T. Woodyatt's brother Ernest (1874–1922) became an architect.

Rollin T. Woodyatt graduated in 1897 from Chicago Manual Training School in 1897 and studied at Cornell University from 1897 to 1898. He graduated with an M.D. from Rush Medical College in 1902 and from 1902 to 1904 was a medical intern at Chicago's Presbyterian Hospital, which became part of Rush University Medical Center. At Chicago's Presbyterian Hospital, after completing his internship, he joined the hospital staff as an assistant in medicine and later became an attending physician. At Rush Medical College, he also served as a clinical professor and eventually became the chair of the department of medicine.

He graduated with a B.S. in 1906 from the University of Chicago, where he studied carbohydrate metabolism under John Ulric Nef and also studied under Julius Stieglitz and William Draper Harkins. Woodyatt studied at European laboratories from 1906 to 1908, where he studied for a year in Vienna and then in Munich, where he was profoundly influenced by Friedrich von Müller. Upon his return to the United States, Woodyatt worked at Presbyterian Hospital under Frank Billings (1854–1932) and James B. Herrick but became increasingly devoted to laboratory work on "the chemistry and physiology of carbohydrate metabolism and experimental forms of diabetes." Woodyatt was a perfectionist and disliked teaching undergraduates. In 1916 he gave one of the Harvey Lectures of the Harvey Society of New York. During WW I, he served as a major in the U.S. Army.

Banting and Best's successful isolation in July 1921 of insulin from canine islets of Langerhans changed the direction of Woodyatt's research in diabetology.

During the trial of Leopold and Loeb in 1924, Woodyatt, as an expert on endocrinology, testified as a witness for the state of Illinois against the defense led by Clarence Darrow.

During the early 1930s, leading laboratories in diabetology were Woodyatt's laboratory in Chicago, Russell M. Wilder's laboratory at the Mayo Clinic, and Elliott P. Joslin's laboratory in Boston.

Woodyatt was elected to the presidencies of three learned societies: in 1916 to the American Society for Clinical Investigation, in 1936 to the Association of American Physicians, and in 1941 to the Institute of Medicine of Chicago (established in 1915 by Frank Billings, Ludvig Hektoen, William A. Pusey, and 26 other prominent physicians). Woodyatt was awarded the 1948 Banting Medal of the American Diabetes Association.

He was a lifelong bachelor.

Woodyatt formula
In 1921 a paper by Philip Anderson Shaffer (1881–1960) and a paper R. T. Woodyatt "presented a detailed theory of antiketogenesis, the underlying principle being that the ketones are formed in the course of the normal metabolism and are completely oxidized, provided that they come into contact with a sufficient quantity of glucose which is itself in the process of oxidation. In the absence of this "oxidizing" glucose they accumulate in the tissues. Both Shaffer and Woodyatt ... published formulas by which to estimate ketogenic balance." Arthur P. Thomson published in 1924 his findings concerning the Woodyatt formula as it pertained to diabetic patients undergoing dietary treatments in the pre-insulin era. Using the ideas of Shaffer and Woodyatt, Clarence Dean Withrow (1927–2006) published in 1980 a new formula for the ketogenic ratio (which is defined as the ratio of the sum of ketogenic factors to the sum of antiketogenic factors).

Selected publications

References

1878 births
1953 deaths
20th-century American physicians
American diabetologists
Rush Medical College alumni
Rush Medical College faculty
University of Chicago alumni
Physicians from Chicago